Johan Giesecke (born 9 September 1949) is a Swedish physician and Professor Emeritus at the Karolinska Institute in Stockholm.

Giesecke was born in Stockholm. He defended his thesis, On The Molecular Structure Of Dopaminergic Substances, at the Karolinska Institute. He trained as an infectious disease clinician and worked with AIDS patients during the 1980s. Giesecke received an MSc in epidemiology from the London School of Hygiene and Tropical Medicine in 1992, after which he worked as a Senior Lecturer at the school.

From 1995 to 2005, Giesecke served as state epidemiologist of Sweden. During a one-year sabbatical 1999-2000 he led a group at the World Health Organization working on the revision of the International Health Regulations. After this, he was Chief Scientist at the European Centre for Disease Prevention and Control from 2005 to 2014. Since 2019 and as of 2022, Giesecke is a member of the Strategic and Technical Advisory Group for Infectious Hazards of the World Health Organization,. He worked as an advisor to the Public Health Agency of Sweden during the COVID-19 pandemic in Sweden.

Publications

English 
On The Molecular Structure Of Dopaminergic Substances (Balder, 1979)
Modern Infectious Disease Epidemiology (Edward Arnold, 1994)

Swedish 
Att förebygga HIV: Psykosocialt omhändertagande vid kontaktspårning (Studentlitteratur, 1991)

References

External links 
 Johan Giesecke at Karolinska Institute

1949 births
Living people
Physicians from Stockholm
Swedish epidemiologists
Swedish civil servants
COVID-19 researchers
Academics of the London School of Hygiene & Tropical Medicine
Academic staff of the Karolinska Institute
World Health Organization officials
Swedish people of German descent